Consort Qing (25 October 1840 – 15 June 1885), of the Han Chinese Zhang clan, was a consort of Xianfeng Emperor.

Life

Family background 
Consort Qing was a member of Han Chinese Zhang clan. Her personal name was Wulingchun (武陵春; corresponding spring views of Great Wall of China).

 Father: Yuanhu (园户), served as a worker in Imperial Gardens.
 Paternal grandfather: Yuanhu (苑户), a worker in Imperial Gardens.

 One younger brother and one elder brother.

Xianfeng era 
Lady Zhang entered the Forbidden City in 1853 as a palace maid of Changchun palace. In 1855, she was granted a title of "Noble Lady Qing" ("qing" meaning "glad"). Wulingchun was one of the Four Spring Ladies (四春娘娘). The other ladies were : Noble Lady Lu,  Noble Lady Ji and Noble Lady Xi. As a noble lady, she moved to Chuxiu palace and lived together with future Empress Dowager Cixi. She remained childless during Xianfeng era.

Tongzhi era 
In 1861, Noble Lady Qing was promoted to "Concubine Qing". In 1868, she moved to the Study of Happiness and Peace (吉安所) which had been a residence of Dowager Concubine Rong and lived there with Consort Xi.

Guangxu era 
In 1875, Concubine Qing was further promoted to "Consort Qing" (慶妃). Zhang Wulingchun died on 15 June 1885 and was interred at Ding Mausoleum of the Eastern Qing tombs.

Titles 
 During the reign of the Xianfeng Emperor (r. 1850–1861):
 Lady Zhang (from unknown date
 Servant (from 1853)
 Noble Lady Qing (慶貴人; from 1855), sixth rank consort 
 During the reign of the Tongzhi Emperor (r. 1861–1875):
 Concubine Qing (慶嬪; from 1861), fifth rank consort 
 During the reign of the Guangxu Emperor (r. 1875–1908):
 Consort Qing (慶妃; from 1875), fourth rank consort

See also
 Ranks of imperial consorts in China#Qing
 Royal and noble ranks of the Qing dynasty

References 

Consorts of the Xianfeng Emperor
19th-century Chinese women
19th-century Chinese people
1840 births
1885 deaths
Manchu people